Nextspace is a consultancy for the 3D visualisation industry based in New Zealand, initially created with New Zealand government support and owned by a not-for-profit trust. Nextspace’s stated goal is to “build a $1 billion visual communications industry in New Zealand which makes complex 3D data accessible, easy-to-use and interactive in a range of applications.”

Formation
The organisation was formed as a collaboration between the New Zealand government and Right Hemisphere, a leading provider of visual communication and collaboration solutions. Nextspace is owned by the Nextspace Foundation, a not-for-profit trust.

Nextspace 3D Visualisation Cluster
Nextspace co-ordinates the “Nextspace 3D Visualisation Cluster”, which includes companies, universities, research organisations, schools and government agencies that use 3D applications for training, product design, project management, visual manufacturing, and sales and marketing.

Notes

Software companies of New Zealand